The Stanfields are a Canadian rock music group, based in Halifax, Nova Scotia. Described by some sources as "the bastard children of AC/DC and Stan Rogers", the band blends a hard rock style with elements of traditional Atlantic Canadian folk music. The Stanfields are known for their powerful live show, and they have toured mostly in Canada and Germany.

History
Formed in 2008, the band consists of lead vocalist and guitarist Jon Landry, bassist Dillan Tate, guitarist Jason MacIsaac, bouzouki/fiddle player Calen Kinney, and drummer Mark Murphy.

The band formed and started out by playing Rock, Folk, and Country music cover songs during open mic performances at the Seahorse Tavern in Halifax, Nova Scotia.  They quickly gained local notoriety for their rowdy, entertaining live performances and were signed to Halifax independent label Groundswell Music in February 2010. In 2012 the band signed a distribution deal with Cologne-based punk rock label, Rookie Records.

The Stanfields released their debut album Vanguard of the Young & Reckless in 2010, and followed up with Death & Taxes in 2012. A third album, For King and Country was released on October 15, 2013. The album contained 10 new songs written, performed and recorded completely acoustically.

The band's fourth full-length record, Modem Operandi, was released on September 18, 2015.

In early April 2020, during the COVID-19 pandemic, Nova Scotia premier Stephen McNeil made a speech in which he instructed Nova Scotians to "stay the blazes home" in order to protect the public from the spread of the virus. The Stanfields helped popularize the message by releasing a new song called Stay the Blazes Home.

Band members 
 Jon Landry – vocals, guitar
 Dillan Tate – bass
 Calen Kinney – bouzouki, fiddle, vocals
 Jason MacIsaac – guitar, vocals
 Mark Murphy – drums

Former members 
 Craig Eugene Harris – bass, mandolin, vocals 
 Jason Wright – bouzouki, vocals 
 Charlie Coolen – guitar 
 Jenny Wright – guitar

Discography

Studio albums 

 Vanguard of the Young & Reckless (GroundSwell, 2010)
 Death & Taxes – (GroundSwell, 2012)
 For King and Country – (GroundSwell, 2013)
 Modem Operandi – (GroundSwell, 2015)
 Limboland – (Rookie/GroundSwell, 2018)

Extended plays 

 Classic Fadeout – (Groundswell, 2020)

Awards 

 2013 East Coast Music Awards - Group Recording of the Year for Death & Taxes and the Fan's Choice Entertainer of the Year.
 2013 Music Nova Scotia Awards - Group Recording of the Year for Death & Taxes and the Fan's Choice Entertainer of the Year.
 2014 Music Nova Scotia Awards - Folk Recording of the Year for For King and Country

References

External links
Official website

Canadian rock music groups
Musical groups from Halifax, Nova Scotia
Musical groups established in 2008
2008 establishments in Nova Scotia